Rhabdophyllum is a genus of flowering plants in the family Ochnaceae, native to western and central Tropical Africa. Nuclear DNA evidence shows that it is sister to Campylospermum.

Species
The following species are accepted:
Rhabdophyllum affine 
Rhabdophyllum arnoldianum 
Rhabdophyllum calophyllum 
Rhabdophyllum crassipedicellatum 
Rhabdophyllum letestui 
Rhabdophyllum rigidum 
Rhabdophyllum thonneri 
Rhabdophyllum welwitschii

References

Ochnaceae
Malpighiales genera
Flora of West Tropical Africa
Flora of Sudan
Flora of West-Central Tropical Africa
Flora of Angola
Flora of Zambia